Aa achalensis is a species of orchid in the genus Aa.

References

achalensis
Plants described in 1920